Emrys Evans (24 April 1911 – 23 June 1983) was a Welsh dual-code international rugby union, and professional rugby league footballer who played in the 1930s and 1940s.

Background
Emrys Evans was born in Gwaun-Cae-Gurwen, Neath Port Talbot, Wales, and he died aged 72 in Bristol, Avon.

International honours
Emrys Evans won caps for Wales (RU) while at Llanelli RFC in 1937 against England, and in 1939 against Scotland, and Ireland, and won a cap for Wales (RL) (Heritage № 185) while at Salford in 1945.

References

External links
Statistics at wigan.rlfans.com

1911 births
1983 deaths
Dual-code rugby internationals
Llanelli RFC players
Rugby league players from Neath Port Talbot
Rugby league props
Rugby union flankers
Rugby union players from Neath Port Talbot
Salford Red Devils players
Wales international rugby union players
Wales national rugby league team players
Welsh rugby league players
Welsh rugby union players
Wigan Warriors players